Chak Pirana railway station (Urdu and ) is located in Chak Pirana village and the people living there are muhajirs, Gujrat district of Punjab province, Pakistan.

See also
 List of railway stations in Pakistan
 Pakistan Railways

References

External links

Railway stations in Gujrat District
Railway stations on Karachi–Peshawar Line (ML 1)